The 1934 Cork Intermediate Hurling Championship was the 25th staging of the Cork Intermediate Hurling Championship since its establishment by the Cork County Board in 1909.

Ballincollig won the championship following a 3-03 to 2-03 defeat of Kinsale in the final. This was their third championship title in the grade and their first since 1929

Results

Final

References

Cork Intermediate Hurling Championship
Cork Intermediate Hurling Championship